Pseudoxylosteus is a genus of flower longhorn beetles in the family Cerambycidae. There is a single species in Pseudoxylosteus, 
P. ornatus, found in the western United States. It is about 10 mm in length.

References

Further reading

 

 

Lepturinae